The Volvo EX90 is a battery electric mid-size luxury SUV manufactured and marketed by Volvo Cars. A three-row vehicle, it is Volvo's flagship SUV, replacing the XC90. It was released in November 2022 as the first bespoke electric vehicle marketed under the Volvo brand.

Overview 
Prior to its introduction, the design of the EX90 was previewed by the Volvo Concept Recharge in June 2021. Reports previously indicated the production vehicle would be called the Volvo Embla.

The EX90 features a drag coefficient of 0.29 to improve efficiency. It is powered by the same battery pack as the Polestar 3, a 111 kWh (107 kWh usable) battery produced by CATL. With 250 kW DC charging, it is capable of charging 10–80 per cent in around 30 minutes. It also supports bi-directional charging.

The higher model is called the Twin Motor Performance, which offers a claimed  of range.

Combined with 16 ultrasonic sensors, eight cameras, and five radars, the EX90 provide Level 3 autonomous capability. In the interior, the 14.5-inch vertically mounted touchscreen with 5G capability. It utilised the Snapdragon Cockpit Platform by Qualcomm to enable visualisation capabilities of Unreal Engine for the computing power and screen graphics on board the EX90, while the core system is powered by Nvidia Drive AI.

References 

EX90
Mid-size sport utility vehicles
Crossover sport utility vehicles
Luxury crossover sport utility vehicles
Cars introduced in 2022
Rear-wheel-drive vehicles
All-wheel-drive vehicles
Production electric cars
Flagship vehicles